The El Salvador–Guatemala border is a  international boundary in the northeast–southwest direction, northwest of El Salvador, and separating the country from the territory of Guatemala. From north to south, it starts in the triple border of the two countries with Honduras, near the peak Monte Cristo in Volcanoes National Park, extending to the southwest by the Pacific Ocean coast, following the final stage the Rio Paz. It separates the department of Jutiapa in Guatemala from Ahuachapan (north) and Santa Ana departments in El Salvador.

References

 
Borders of El Salvador
Borders of Guatemala
International borders